The National Trade Unions Confederation (NTUC) is a national trade union center in Mauritius.

The two primary affiliates of NTUC are the Federation of Civil Service Unions, and the Organization of Artisans' Unity.

NTUC is affiliated with the International Trade Union Confederation.

References

Trade unions in Mauritius
International Trade Union Confederation